Gümüşakar can refer to:

 Gümüşakar, Karakoçan
 Gümüşakar, Refahiye